Elections were held in Illinois on Tuesday, November 7, 1944.

Primaries were held April 11, 1944.

Election information

Turnout
In the primaries, 1,428,685 ballots were cast (635,487 Democratic and 793,198 Republican).

In the general election, 4,079,024 ballots were cast.

Federal elections

United States President 

Illinois voted for the Democratic ticket of Franklin D. Roosevelt and Harry S. Truman.

United States Senate 

Incumbent Democrat Scott W. Lucas won reelection to a second term.

United States House 

All 26 Illinois seats in the United States House of Representatives were up for election in 1944.

Democrats flipped four Republican-held seats, making the composition of Illinois' House delegation 15 Republicans and 11 Democrats.

State elections

Governor

Incumbent Governor Dwight H. Green, a Republican, was reelected to a second term.

Democratic primary

Republican primary

General election

Lieutenant Governor

Incumbent Lieutenant Governor Hugh W. Cross, a Republican, was reelected to a second term.

Democratic primary

Republican primary

General election

Attorney General 

 
Incumbent Attorney General George F. Barrett, a Republican, won reelection to second term.

Democratic primary

Republican primary

General election

Secretary of State 

Incumbent third-term Secretary of State  Edward J. Hughes, a Democrat, did not seek reelection. Hughes then died before the general election, and in June 1944, Richard Yates Rowe, a Republican, was appointed to fill the rest of his term. In the election, Democrat Edward J. Barrett was elected to permanently succeed them in office.

Democratic primary

Republican primary
Arnold P. Benson won the Republican primary, defeating incumbent Illinois Treasurer and former congressman William Stratton.

General election

Auditor of Public Accounts 

Incumbent Auditor of Public Accounts Arthur C. Lueder, a Republican, was reelected to a second term.

Democratic primary

Republican primary

General election

Treasurer 

Incumbent first-term Treasurer William G. Stratton, a Republican, did not seek reelection, instead opting to run for Secretary of State. Republican Conrad F. Becker was elected to succeed him in office.

Democratic primary

Republican primary

General election

Clerk of the Supreme Court 

Incumbent Clerk of the Supreme Court Edward F. Cullinane, a Democrat appointed to the office in 1940 after the death in office of Adam F. Bloch, did not seek reelection. Republican Earle Benjamin Searcy was elected to succeed him in office.

Democratic primary

Republican primary

General election

State Senate
Seats of the Illinois Senate were up for election in 1944. Republicans retained control of the chamber.

State House of Representatives
Seats in the Illinois House of Representatives were up for election in 1944. Republicans retained control of the chamber.

Trustees of University of Illinois

An election was held for three of the nine seats for Trustees of University of Illinois. The election was for six-year terms. All three Democratic nominees won. However, since all three seats up for election were already held by Democrats, the partisan composition of the University of Illinois Board of Trustees remained unchanged, with a 9–3 Republican majority over Democrats.

Democratic incumbent Karl A. Meyer was reelected to a third term. Democratic incumbent Kenny E. Williamson, who had been appointed to fill a vacancy in 1940 was reelected to his first full term. New Democratic member Walter W. McLaughlin was also elected. First-term Democratic incumbent Frank A. Jensen was not nominated for reelection.

Ballot measures
Two ballot measures were put before voters in 1944. One was a legislatively referred state statute and one was a legislatively referred constitutional amendment.

In order to be approved, legislatively referred state statues required the support of a majority of those voting on the statute. In order to be approved, legislatively referred constitutional amendments required approval equal to a majority of voters voting in the entire general election.

Illinois County Officer Term Limit Amendment
Illinois County Officer Term Limit Amendment, a legislatively referred constitutional amendment which would have amended Section 8 of Article X of the Constitution of the 1870 Constitution of Illinois, failed to meet the threshold for approval.

The amendment would have removed a constitutional provision requiring elected county officers to wait for four years after their term expired before they would be eligible to hold that same office again.

Illinois General Banking Law Amendment 
The Illinois General Banking Law Amendment, a legislatively referred state statute which amended section 10 of the Illinois General Banking Law, was approved by voters.

Local elections
Local elections were held.

References

 
Illinois